USS Alameda has been the name of more than one United States Navy ship, and may refer to:

 , the proposed designation for a motorboat considered for naval use in 1917 but never acquired by the Navy
 , the proposed designation for a steamer considered for naval use during World War I but never acquired by the Navy
 , originally designated Fuel Ship No. 10, a tanker in commission from 1919 to 1922
 , the name and designation prospectively assigned to the smaller SS Monterey (the larger being the Matson liner) for use as a troop transport in 1942. Monterey was returned to the War Shipping Administration and then assigned to Army operation as USAT Monterey.

See also
 

United States Navy ship names